Luitpoldbreen is a glacier in Sabine Land at Spitsbergen, Svalbard. It is named after Luitpold, Prince Regent of Bavaria. The glacier is tributary to Hayesbreen. The mountain of Jebensfjellet is surrounded by Luitpoldbreen, Hayesbreen and Königsbergbreen.

References

Glaciers of Spitsbergen